Bothati is an armed Indian martial art from Maharashtra. It is particularly known for its use of the uniquely Indian patta (sword) and vita (corded lance). The early history of Bothati as a distinct system is difficult to trace prior to the 1600s, but it is said to owe its development to the particular geographic conditions of Maharashtra. A hilly region characterized by valleys and caves, the inhabitants became expert horsemen who favoured light armour and highly mobile cavalry units during war.

History

Maratha empire
Mardani khel began its rise to prominence during the early 1600s when the Deccan sultanates relied on the guerilla tactics of Maratha units led by Shahaji. His son Shivaji Raje Bhosale learned the art of fighting from a young age and by his adolescence was already proficient in the use of various arms. His weapon of choice was a 4-foot sword named Bhawani. At the age of 17, Shivaji took advantage of the chaotic affairs of the Deccan and subverted Bijapuri authority to strike it out on his own. The Maratha community, once scattered across the Deccan, united under Shivaji to create an independent kingdom in the Western Ghats. A Hindu confederacy during a time of intolerant Muslim rule meant that the Marathas were constantly under threat from the Mughals. With limited access to Mughal firearms, they instead capitalized on the local terrain which was unsuitable for the heavy artillery of the invaders. As a result, the Mughals were often forced into hand-to-hand combat, giving the Marathas an advantage despite their comparatively light armour.

Chalukya period
The heavily martial culture and propensity for the spear of the Marathi people  is mentioned as early as the 7th century by the Chinese monk Xuanzang.
"The climate is hot, the disposition of the people is honest and simple, they are of medium build, and of a stern, vindictive character. To their benefactor they are grateful, to their enemies relentless. If they are insulted, they will risk their life to salvage themselves. If they are asked to help one in distress, they willingly agree to. If they are going to seek revenge, they first give their enemy warning, then each being armed they attack each other with lances. When one turns to flee, the other pursues him, but they do not kill a man down (a person who submits). The country provides for a band of champions to the number of several hundred. Each time they are about to engage in conflict, they intoxicate themselves with wine, and then one man with lance in hand will meet ten thousand and challenges them in fight."

According to Xuanzang, this band of champions was seemingly undefeatable in battle. "No enemy can stand before them", and this allowed their king Pulakeshin II to "treat his neighbours with contempt". Denied his rightful place on the throne by his uncle Mangalesha, Pulakeshin organised an army of warriors and led them against his relative. Feudatories challenged Pulakeshin after his coronation, but his army was able to put down all rivals. After further enlarging his fighting force, Pulakeshin embarked on a series of conquests, extending Chalukya reign across most of the Dakhin plateau. In 630 AD he confidently defied the emperor Harsha Vardhana who sent all his troops and the ablest commanders but failed to impress Pulakeshin's gladiators.

British colonial rule
As with many of India's fighting systems the mardani khel gradually declined in importance during the colonial period when firearms were more widely adopted. The art never died out, however, as British colonists of the 18th century recognized the military qualities of the Maratha people. Sir G Malet wrote that even after the introduction of guns, few Maratha soldiers carried any weapons other than two swords. In 1768 the Maratha Light Infantry regiment was formed to protect the British East India Company's possessions in Bombay.

Weapons

Pata: sword with a hollow handle acting as a handguard
Talwar: curved single-edge sword
Bhala: short spear with a broad head, used by infantry
Barcha: heavy spear made entirely of iron and wielded by infantry
Vita: lance with a length of cord tying the weapon to the wielder’s hand
Bothati: lance used from horseback
Lathi: stick or staff
Dhala: circular shield
Madhu: a thrusting weapon inspired by deer horns
Kurhad: axe
Danda: Battle-axe
Khukuri: inward-curving knife
Danushya: bow and arrow
Katyara: push-dagger with a H-shaped handle
Bagh naka: iron claw
Bichuwa / Bichawa: scorpion knife

See also
Indian martial arts
Gatka
Silambam
Kalaripayattu

References

Indian martial arts
Marathi culture
Culture of Maharashtra